The Bajaur Scouts is a paramilitary regiment of the Frontier Corps Khyber Pakhtunkhwa (North) of Pakistan, recruited locally in Bajaur District and officered by regular Pakistan Army officers. The Scouts were previously the Bajaur Levies, and served in the Bajaur, Swat, and Dir tribal areas.
The force was formed in April 1961 from several units of the Khyber Rifles and Chitral Scouts. In the early 21st century, the Scouts have been involved in anti-drugs operations. In 2011-2012, the unit received a number of drug testing kits to assist in their work against drug smuggling.

Units
 Headquarters Wing
 171 Wing
 172 Wing
 173 Wing
 174 Wing
 175 Wing
 176 Wing
 177 Wing

References

Regiments of the Frontier Corps
Bajaur District
Frontier Corps Khyber Pakhtunkhwa (North)